is a Japanese comedian.

Character
Representative of the so-called "reaction entertainers," he is known for his thick voice. His favorite phrase is "Yabaiyo, yabaiyo!" (やばいよやばいよ!, It's dangerous, dangerous!), which has been mimicked by many co-stars. Degawa appeared on the 19th Sasuke competition, where he struggled on the first obstacle (the Sextuple Step) and failed on the second obstacle (the Log Grip).

Filmography

Film
Tora-san, Wish You Were Here (2019)

TV Drama
 Mysterious girl Nile Thutmose (1991) - Third Son of Nile Demon Three Brothers (Actord by : Satoru Saito (Eldest Son) (ep. 16, 18), Yoshiaki Umegaki (Second Son) (ep. 16 - 18)) (ep. 16 - 18)

Dubbing
Piranha 3D (2011) - Deputy Fallon (Ving Rhames)

See also
 Teruyoshi Uchimura (内村光良)
 Kiyotaka Nanbara (南原清隆)
 Udo Suzuki (Kyai~n) (ウド鈴木 [キャイ～ン])
 Yoshihiro Suzuki (鈴木慶裕)

References

External links
 Official profile (Japanese)

1964 births
Living people
Japanese comedians
People from Yokohama
Sasuke (TV series) contestants